James Murdoch Geikie PRSE FRS LLD (23 August 1839 – 1 March 1915) was a Scottish geologist. He was professor of geology at Edinburgh University from 1882 to 1914.

Life

Education
He was born in Edinburgh, the son of James Stuart Geikie and Isabella Thom, and younger brother of Sir Archibald Geikie. His father was a wig-maker and perfumer in Edinburgh operating from 35 North Bridge. James was educated at the Royal High School, Edinburgh and initially apprenticed as a printer to Archibald Constable and Company before going to University of Edinburgh to study geology.

Career
He served on the Geological Survey from 1862 until 1882, when he succeeded his brother as Murchison professor of geology and mineralogy at the University of Edinburgh. He took as his special subject of investigation the origin of surface-features, and the part played in their formation by glacial action. His views are embodied in his chief work, The Great Ice Age and its Relation to the Antiquity of Man (1874; 3rd ed., 1894).

In 1871 he was elected a fellow of the Royal Society of Edinburgh. His proposer was his brother, Archibald Geikie. He served twice as vice-president (1892–97 and 1900–05) and once as president (1913–15).

He was elected a fellow of the Royal Society in 1875, his candidacy citation reading 

In 1876, he was elected as a member to the American Philosophical Society.

From 1861 he lived at 16 Duncan Street in Edinburgh. In 1882 he moved to London, returning to Edinburgh only in later life.

Geikie became the leader of the school that upholds the all-important action of land-ice, as against those geologists who assign chief importance to the work of pack ice and icebergs. Continuing this line of investigation in his Prehistoric Europe (1881), he maintained the hypothesis of five inter-Glacial periods in Great Britain, and argued that the palaeolithic deposits of the Pleistocene period were not post- but inter- or pre-Glacial. His Fragments of Earth Lore: Sketches and Addresses, Geological and Geographical (1893) and Earth Sculpture (1898) are mainly concerned with the same subject. His Outlines of Geology (1886), a standard textbook of its subject, reached its third edition in 1896; and in 1905 he published an important manual on structural and field geology.

In 1887 he displayed another side of his activity in a volume of Songs and Lyrics by H. Heine and other German Poets, done into English Verse. From 1888 he was honorary editor of the Scottish Geographical Magazine. In 1910 he was awarded the Gold Medal of the Royal Scottish Geographical Society.

In 1904 he was elected president of the Royal Scottish Geographical Society and held this role until 1910.

In later life he lived at "Kilmorie", 83 Colinton Road in south-west Edinburgh, it then being a new house by the architect Edward Calvert.

He died at home on 1 March 1915 and is buried on the western side of Morningside Cemetery, Edinburgh.

John Muir (1838–1914) named a glacier in Alaska after Geikie.

Publications

The Great Ice Age (1874)
Prehistoric Europe (1880)
Earth Sculpture: The Origin of Land Forms (1913)
Mountains: Their Origin Growth and Decay (1913)
The Antiquity of Man in Europe (1914)

See also 

 Ordnance Gazetteer of Scotland: A Graphic and Accurate Description of Every Place in Scotland (Geikie contributed its section on Scotland's leading physical features)

References

 1913.  Mountains, Their Origin,Growth and Decay.

External links
 
 
 

1839 births
1915 deaths
19th-century Scottish people
Scientists from Edinburgh
People educated at the Royal High School, Edinburgh
Alumni of the University of Edinburgh
Academics of the University of Edinburgh
Presidents of the Royal Society of Edinburgh
Presidents of the Royal Scottish Geographical Society
Fellows of the Royal Society
Fellows of the Geological Society of London
Scottish geologists